Galeocerdo clarkensis is an extinct relative of the modern tiger shark that lived in Eocene Alabama, Georgia, and  Louisiana. Fossils have also been found in  Mississippi. Six collections of fossils are known.

References

clarkensis
Eocene fish of North America